Clubiona vegeta is a sac spider species found in Europe, Central Asia, North Africa and the Canary Islands.

See also 
 List of Clubionidae species

References

External links 

Clubionidae
Spiders of Europe
Spiders of Africa
Spiders of Asia
Spiders of the Canary Islands
Spiders described in 1918